Tadas Langaitis is a Lithuanian politician, from November 2016 member of the Seimas,  civic activist, active in social and civic projects in Lithuania.

Awards and recognition
Tadas Langaitis was nominated in Young Entrepreneur of the Year category by Swedish Business Awards for social entrepreneurship. He was also nominated for The Outstanding Young Persons of the World award by JCI Lithuania in 2014.

Tadas Langatis was awarded with Order for Merits to Lithuania by the President of Lithuania in 2013.

References

External links
Aukok.lt - online donation platform
Global Lithuanian leaders social network
"White gloves" - civic anti-corruption movement online

1977 births
Living people
Lithuanian activists
Members of the Seimas
Investment bankers
Politicians from Kaunas
21st-century Lithuanian politicians